Andrew Thatcher is an Australian born actor and film director. His directing highlights include the action films Urban Lockdown and Charity Hurts.

Biography

Andrew Thatcher is an Australian independent creator of films and video games. Outside of film making and acting Andrew has a passion for photography and has had his works published on numerous occasions. He also is an avid martial artist and performs as a Pro wrestler 'Bushido' on the Australian independent wrestling circuit.

While his favorite genre is action, his works also have elements of comedy as he embraces B movie, low budget aesthetics.

He is most well known for his film and video games of Urban Lockdown and Bad ass babes.

Selected filmography

2019: Bad ass babes 
writer, director, editor, action choreographer
Actor: Johnny Doomsday

2015: Urban Lockdown
writer, director, editor, fight choreographer
Actor: Rick

2010: Charity hurts 
writer, director, editor, fight choreographer
Actor: Jason Jones

2009: Two's company, thieves a crowd (feature)
writer, director, editor, fight choreographer
Actor: James

References

External links
 
Cannes 07
 
 

Australian male actors
Australian film directors
Living people
Year of birth missing (living people)